In algebraic geometry, a Plücker surface, studied by , is a quartic surface in 3-dimensional projective space with a double line and 8 nodes.

Construction
For any quadric line complex, the lines of the complex in a plane envelop a quadric in the plane. A Plücker surface
depends on the choice of a quadric line complex and a line, and consists of points of the quadrics associated to  the planes through the chosen line.

References
 

Algebraic surfaces